Aguila Ammunition is a Mexican manufacturer of firearms cartridges, under Industrias Tecnos of Cuernavaca. Industrias Tecnos was established in 1961, under the name Cartuchos Deportivos de México (It was changed to Tecnos in 1978), as a manufacturer of sporting and rimfire cartridges in collaboration with the American Remington Arms.

Notable Products
the .22 SSS (Sniper SubSonic) cartridge, a very heavy .22LR cartridge that creates no sonic crack
.22 Colibri, a short .22 rimfire with a primer but no propellant
.17 PMC/Aguila
12 gauge Minishell

References

External links
 Aguila official site

Ammunition manufacturers
Defense companies of Mexico
Companies based in Morelos
Manufacturing companies established in 1961
Mexican companies established in 1961
Mexican brands